Chloris virgata is a species of grass known by the common names feather fingergrass feathery Rhodes-grass and feather windmillgrass.

Distribution
It is native to many of the warmer temperate, subtropical, and tropical regions of the world, including parts of Eurasia, Africa, and the Americas, and it is present in many other areas as a naturalized species, including Hawaii, Australia, and the Canary Islands.

Chloris virgata is a hardy grass which can grow in many types of habitat, including disturbed areas such as roadsides and railroad tracks, and cultivated farmland. It is known in some areas as a weed, for example, in alfalfa fields in the southwestern United States.

Description
This is an annual grass growing up to about half a meter in maximum height. It sometimes forms tufts, and may or may not spread via stolons. The inflorescence is an array of 4 to 20 fingerlike branches up to 10 centimeters long. Each branch contains approximately 10 spikelets per centimeter. Each spikelet has one fertile floret and one or two sterile florets.

References

External links
Jepson Manual Treatment - Chloris virgata
Vascular Plants of the Gila Wilderness
Missouri Plants Photo Profile
Chloris virgata - Photo gallery
 

virgata
Native grasses of California
Native grasses of Texas
Grasses of Alabama
Grasses of Argentina
Grasses of Mexico
Grasses of the United States
Flora of the Southwestern United States
Flora of the Southeastern United States
Flora of the California desert regions
Flora of the Sonoran Deserts
Flora of Argentina
Flora of South America
Plants described in 1797
Taxa named by Olof Swartz
Flora without expected TNC conservation status